Gaston Ahi Robbins (September 26, 1858 – February 22, 1902) was a U.S. Representative from Alabama.

Born in Goldsboro, North Carolina, Robbins moved to Randolph County, North Carolina.
He attended Trinity College at Durham and was graduated from the University of North Carolina at Chapel Hill in 1879.
He studied law.
He was admitted to the bar in 1880 and commenced practice in Selma, Alabama.

Robbins was elected as a Democrat to the Fifty-third Congress (March 4, 1893 – March 3, 1895).
Presented credentials as a Member-elect to the Fifty-fourth Congress and served from March 4, 1895, to March 13, 1896, when he was succeeded by William F. Aldrich, who contested his election.
Presented credentials to the Fifty-sixth Congress and served from March 4, 1899, to March 8, 1900, when he was again succeeded by William F. Aldrich, who contested his election.
He resumed the practice of law in New York City, where he died on February 22, 1902.
He was interred in Oakwood Cemetery, Statesville, North Carolina.

References

External links

 

1858 births
1902 deaths
Democratic Party members of the United States House of Representatives from Alabama
Politicians from Selma, Alabama
19th-century American politicians